Alais is a surname. Notable people with the surname include:

Ernesto Alais (1929–2016), Argentine sport shooter
John Alais (1778–1847), British engraver 
Juan Alais (1844–1914), Argentine musician, grandson of John Alais

See also
Alès, in France
Alexie Alaïs (born 1994), French athlete